John Jewkes (1902–1988) was a British classical liberal economist. He was Professor of Economic Organisation at Merton College, Oxford.

His main work, Ordeal by Planning, was written in 1946 and argued that the central planning implemented in the United Kingdom during World War II will lead to poverty if it is adopted as a permanent economic system, a thesis quite similar to the one developed by Friedrich Hayek in 1945 in The Road to Serfdom. His line of thought was close to the ordoliberal thesis of Wilhelm Röpke and Walter Eucken.

He is also remembered for his book The Sources of Invention (1958), written with two research assistants, David Sawers and Richard Stillerman.  It is based on 50 case studies of 19th century and 20th century technological innovations and is considered a pioneering study in the economics of innovation.

He was president of the Mont Pelerin Society from 1962 to 1964.

Bibliography

References

External links 
 Biography of John Jewkes, at University of Buckingham
 An Unassailable Case Against Government Planning by John Jewkes
 The Sources of Invention by John Jewkes (brief summary of book by the author)
 

1988 deaths
1902 births
British classical liberals
Academics of the University of Buckingham
20th-century  British economists
Fellows of Merton College, Oxford
Member of the Mont Pelerin Society